Kosmos 398 (meaning Cosmos 398) was the second unmanned test flight of the Soviet LK lander, using the T2K version. It followed the same program as Kosmos 379, launching on February 26, 1971 into a 276 km by 196 km orbit. It main objective was to validate contingency abort-to-lunar orbit manoeuvres.

See also

 1971 in spaceflight

References

External links 
 Mir Hardware Heritage (Wikisource)

Kosmos 0398
Soviet lunar program
1971 in the Soviet Union
Spacecraft launched in 1971